Vietnam will participate in the 2013 Asian Indoor and Martial Arts Games in Incheon, South Korea on 29 June – 6 July 2013.

Vietnam sent 102 athletes which will compete in 11 sports.

Medalists

References

External links 

Asian Indoor and Martial Arts Games
Asian Indoor and Martial Arts Games 2013
Vietnam
Vietnam at the Asian Indoor Games